Jane Ziegelman is director of the culinary program at New York City's Tenement Museum and author of 97 Orchard: An Edible History of Five Immigrant Families and Foie Gras: A Passion.

Her book 97 Orchard is about Jewish, Irish, German, Russian and Italian people living together in a tenement building on Orchard Street (Manhattan) in Manhattan's Lower East Side between 1863 and 1936. The book was published by HarperCollins. The Tenement Museum of the Lower East Side is located at 97 Orchard.

References

External links
Book talk

Living people
American non-fiction writers
Year of birth missing (living people)
Writers from New York City